The Manitoba wolf (Canis lupus griseoalbus), also known as the grey-white wolf, is an extinct subspecies of gray wolf that roamed in the southern Northwest Territories, northern Alberta,  Saskatchewan, and south-central Manitoba. This wolf is recognized as a subspecies of Canis lupus in the taxonomic authority Mammal Species of the World (2005).

History
In the early 19th century, John Richardson first cataloged the Manitoba wolf and gave it its taxonomic name. The species itself was highly prized for its fur and was hunted to extinction in the wild in the early 20th century.

References

Mammals of Canada
Endemic fauna of Canada
Subspecies of Canis lupus
Mammals described in 1858

fr:Canis lupus griseoalbus